Ocaña is a city and municipality in the Colombian Department of Norte de Santander. Ocaña is the second largest populated center of this department. It played an important role during the Independence of Colombia from the Spanish monarchy.

History
The city was founded on 14 December of 1570 by Captain Francisco Fernández de Contreras, as part of the third populating project of the east, patronised by the Audiencia y Cabildo de Pamplona. Contreras chose the Hacaritama Indigenous Society in order to have more control over the indigenous population of the area and thus be able to found the city. The first name the city received was Santa Ana de Hacarí when it was founded in 1570. During 1575, it was assigned the status of city with its current name, Ocaña. During the time of colonization, Fernandez de Contreras stated that all merchandise coming from Spain and destined for the Madgalena River should pass through the city. The city served as a commercial route during the Viceroyalty to connect the city of Pamplona with the Colombian Caribbean Coast. It also contributed to the development of commercial activities during the post-independence period. Given the geographic location of the settlement, the Audiencia de Santafé, presided over by Andrés Díaz Venero de Leiva, decided that the new town would fall under the jurisdiction of the province of Santa Maria, the governor of which was, at the time, Don Pedro Fernández del Busto. The name Ocaña was given to the new town to honour Fernández del Busto, who was born in Ocaña, Spain. The native peoples in the region were those traditionally called Hacaritamas and those called Cultura Mosquito (Mosquito Culture) or Bajomagdalenense.

In 1828, Ocaña was the site of the inconclusive Convention of Ocaña led by Vice-President Santander where delegates attempted to reform Gran Colombia's written constitution. In 1849, during the period of the New Granada, the Congress ordered the creation of the province of Ocaña, in order to create a Provincial Chamber to legislate the creation of schools and land roads, in addition to organizing the public force and fairs. During the second half of the XIX century, Ocaña adopts a  model, which generates that the area of Ocaña begins to establish commercial routes with Europe and North America.

Geography and climate

 Location: . The city of Ocaña is 610 km from Bogotá.
 Surface: 460 km2, 2.2% of the North Santander Department total area
 Height: 1,202 meters on the level of the sea Ocaña are on the Andean Eastern mountain range. The 2,600 mountains surround that reach msnm. Its average temperature is 22 °C.

Economy
The main economic activities are agriculture, the livestock raising, commerce, small industries and mining, with silver operation, copper and iron. The city is served by the Aguas Claras airport.

International Relations

Twin towns – sister cities 

  Iztapalapa, Mexico

See also
 Cúcuta, the state capital.
 Pamplona, the third municipality of the state.
 Roman Catholic Diocese of Ocaña
 St. Anne's Cathedral, Ocaña

References

 Ocaña official website
 Ocaña Information
 News

 
Municipalities of the Norte de Santander Department
Populated places established in 1570